The Sunday Magazine (also known as The Sunday Magazine for Family Reading) was a London magazine published by Alexander Strahan from 1864 until 1905. It belonged to the genre of "Sunday reading" periodicals, intended to provide religiously-inspired entertainment for families to read on Sundays. It contained a mixture of non-fiction, verse, short stories, and serialized novels, as well as featuring black and white woodcut illustrations by artists such as Robert Barnes, Edward Hughes, and George Pinwell.

It was initially edited by Scottish minister Thomas Guthrie. Due to declining health, Guthrie had retired from ministry in 1864 in favour of literary efforts, and he contributed a significant amount of writing to the magazine during his tenure as editor.

In May 1906, the magazine was merged with Good Words, another religious periodical published by Strahan, resulting in the title Good Words and Sunday Magazine.

References

External links
 Archived issues (1865–1900) at Google Books
 Archived issues (1867–1869) at HathiTrust
 Archived issues (1885–1889) at the Internet Archive

Religious magazines
Defunct magazines published in the United Kingdom
Magazines established in 1864
1864 establishments in the United Kingdom